Frank Thierry Boya (born 1 July 1996) is a Cameroonian international footballer who plays as a midfielder for Belgian club Sint-Truiden, on loan from Antwerp.

Club career
Boya has played for APEJES Academy. During the winter break of the 2016–17 season he transferred to German 2. Bundesliga club 1860 Munich.

In 2017, he joined Belgian club Mouscron. In June 2020 he signed for Antwerp.

On 31 August 2021, Boya was moved on loan to Zulte Waregem. On 24 June 2022, Boya agreed on a new loan to Sint-Truiden.

International career
He made his international debut in 2016, and was named in the squad for the 2017 Africa Cup of Nations.

References

External links

1996 births
Living people
Cameroonian footballers
Cameroon international footballers
APEJES Academy players
TSV 1860 Munich players
Royal Excel Mouscron players
Royal Antwerp F.C. players
S.V. Zulte Waregem players
Sint-Truidense V.V. players
Belgian Pro League players
Association football midfielders
2017 Africa Cup of Nations players
Cameroonian expatriate footballers
Cameroonian expatriate sportspeople in Germany
Expatriate footballers in Germany
Cameroonian expatriate sportspeople in Belgium
Expatriate footballers in Belgium
2016 African Nations Championship players
Cameroon A' international footballers